Daszewo  is a village in Poland. It is located in Białogard County, West Pomeranian Voivodeship in northwestern Poland.

Daszewo is the subject of the documentary film "Deutsch-Polnische Annäherungen in Daszewo" ("German-Polish Reconciliation in Daszewo"). The film compares life memories of German and Polish residents from Daszewo with the hope for better German-Polish cooperation. There is a German and a Polish version of the film.

Geography
Daszewo is approximately 200 miles (320 km) from  Dassow, Germany.

Neighboring municipalities 
In a clockwise direction, beginning in the north, the following cities and municipalities border on Daszewo: Skoczow, Mierzyn, Mierzynek, Ubyslawice, Swiemino, Karlinko, Krzywoploty, Redlino, Karlino, Lulewice, Lubiechowo, and Syrkowice.

References

Daszewo